Refuoe Emmanuel "Fiffy" Rampeta (born 23 March 1995) is a South African professional rugby union player who last played for the  in the domestic Currie Cup. His regular position is flanker.

Rugby career

2007–2013: Schoolboy rugby

Rampeta was born in Bloemfontein and he represented the Bloemfontein-based Free State at various youth levels, from as early as primary school level, when he represented them at the Under-13 Craven Week tournaments in both 2007 and 2008. At high school level, he played for Free State at the Under-16 Grant Khomo Week tournaments in 2010 and 2011, before progressing to their Under-18 team playing at the premier high school rugby union tournament in South Africa, the Under-18 Craven Week. He also played at the Craven Week on two occasions – at the 2012 tournament in Port Elizabeth and the 2013 tournament in Polokwane, appearing in all three matches in each of those tournaments. After the 2013, he was also included in a South Africa Schools squad, and he played for them in one match, a 17–13 victory over their counterparts from France.

2014–2016: Youth rugby, Varsity Cup and first class debut

After high school, Rampeta joined the Free State's youth system. He started their semi-final match against , but could not prevent his side losing 22–29 to be knocked out of the competition.

At the start of 2015, Rampeta played in the Varsity Cup competition for Bloemfontein-based university side . The second of those appearances was in the final against , with Shimlas winning the match 63–33 to win the Varsity Cup for the first time in their history.

Rampeta made two starts for UFS Shimlas in the 2016 Varsity Cup, but his side endured a disappointing season, failing to retain their title by finishing in fifth place on the log to miss out on the semi-finals. He remained in the run-on side, making a further six starts throughout the competition. Rampeta made a total of ten appearances in the competition, helping the Free State XV to finish in sixth place on the log.

In November 2016, he was named in the  Super Rugby team's training squad as the team prepared for the 2017 Super Rugby season.

References

South African rugby union players
Living people
1995 births
Rugby union players from Bloemfontein
Rugby union flankers
Free State Cheetahs players